The Sudbury tornado was an F3 tornado, which hit the Canadian city of Sudbury, Ontario, at approximately 8:30 a.m. on Thursday, August 20, 1970.

It is currently tied for the status of the eighth deadliest tornado in Canadian history.

Storm
Considered unusual because tornadoes of this strength rarely occur in Northern Ontario, the tornado touched down in the nearby town of Lively. The tornado tracked quickly eastward into the city, hitting the town of Copper Cliff and the neighborhoods of Robinson and Lockerby over the next ten minutes. Another tornado associated with the same storm also hit the community of Field, approximately 70 kilometres east of Sudbury, less than an hour later.

The storm continued through North Bay, uprooting some trees in the wilderness but avoiding any damage to the city. It then tracked southeasterly toward Ottawa, leading the federal government to order a precautionary shutdown of its offices in the capital, but the storm weakened around Chalk River and only a few millimetres of rain actually fell on Ottawa by the time it reached that city.

Residents of the region had little warning of the storm as the Sudbury Airport did not at the time have weather radar capable of detecting tornado activity, and the day's only weather forecast was for "showers". The first public indication of the twister, instead, was a phone call to CKSO from a woman frantically reporting that her house was blowing away.

Six people died and 200 were injured in the tornado, which caused an estimated $17 million in 1970 (which is about $ million in ) in damage, including to Inco's copper smelter in Copper Cliff. A pipeline carrying iron-nickel concentrate to the plant collapsed onto a train track below, in turn causing a derailment when a train hit the collapsed pipe, but the incident resulted in only minor injuries. The Inco Superstack, then under construction, swayed in the storm but was not heavily damaged. Six workers were on the construction platform at the time, although all six survived.

Minor damage was also reported to the Big Nickel, with some pitting of the stainless steel panels as rocks and debris hit the monument, although that structure also survived. Damage was also reported to Memorial Hospital, Glad Tidings Tabernacle, and over 300 homes in Lively, Sudbury and Field. Some streets in the affected neighbourhoods were flooded by up to a foot of water, and electrical and communications infrastructure was heavily damaged. For several days after the storm, amateur radio remained the only reliable method of communication into and out of the city.

In Field, a lumber mill which was the town's primary employer was heavily damaged, and a church roof was ripped off just minutes after parishioners had left the building after the end of the morning mass.

Aftermath
Joe Fabbro, the mayor of Sudbury, and Len Turner, the mayor of Lively, each declared their respective communities disaster areas. Both the federal and provincial governments immediately sent representatives to the city to assist, including provincial Attorney General Arthur Wishart, provincial municipal affairs minister Darcy McKeough and federal housing minister Robert Andras. With the company's operations temporarily disabled in the aftermath of the storm, Inco reassigned its employees to assist in rebuilding homes in Lively, which was at the time a company town in which most homes were owned by Inco rather than by private homeowners. In Sudbury, a $2 million relief fund was quickly set up by Sudbury City Council.

Despite the extent of the damage, however, many meteorologists initially resisted classifying the storm as a tornado; although the pattern of damage was consistent with tornadic activity, there were no confirmed reports of a visible funnel cloud. Although it is now generally understood that a tornado can occur without an identifiable funnel in certain weather conditions, this was not as widely accepted in the 1970s. It was not until 1972 that the Canada Atmospheric Environment Service published a final report confirming that a tornado had indeed taken place.

See also 
 List of tornadoes and tornado outbreaks
 List of North American tornadoes and tornado outbreaks
 List of Canadian tornadoes

References

Tornadoes of 1970
1970 in Ontario
Tornadoes in Ontario
History of Greater Sudbury
August 1970 events in Canada